The Wilaya of Ain Salah is an Algerian wilaya created in 2019, previously, a delegated wilaya created in 2015. It is in the Algerian Sahara.

Geography 
The wilaya of in Salah is in the Algerian Sahara, its area 131,220 km².

It is delimited by:

 to the north by the El Menia Province and Ouargla Province;
 to the east by the Illizi Province;
 to the northwest by the Timimoun Province;
 to the west by the wilaya of Adrar;
 and to the south by the Tamanrasset Province.

History 
The wilaya of in Salah was created on November 26, 2019. Previously, it was a delegated wilaya, created on May 27, 2015, creating administrative districts in certain wilayas and fixing the specific rules related to them, as well as the list of municipalities that are attached to it. Before 2019, it was attached to the Tamanrasset Province.

Organization of the wilaya 

During the administrative breakdown of 2015, the delegated wilaya of In Salah is made up of 2 districts and 3 communes.

List of walis

Demography 
According to the general census of population and housing of 2008, all the municipalities of the wilaya of In Salah had  inhabitants

References 

 
Provinces of Algeria
Sahara
States and territories established in 2019